East Moriches is a hamlet and census-designated place in the Town of Brookhaven, Suffolk County, New York, United States. The population was 5,249 at the 2010 census.

The name Moriches comes from Meritces, a Native American who owned land on Moriches Neck.

Geography

Demographics

Demographics for the CDP
As of the census of 2000, there were 4,555 people, 1,510 households, and 1,180 families residing in the CDP. The population density was 836.3 per square mile (322.9/km2). There were 1,668 housing units at an average density of 306.6/sq mi (118.4/km2). The racial makeup of the CDP was 95.55% White, 5.16% Hispanic or Latino, 1.58% African American, 0.04% Native American, 1.45% Asian, 0.24% Pacific Islander, 1.01% from other races, and 1.12% from two or more races.

There were 1,510 households, out of which 39.7% had children under the age of 18 living with them, 67.5% were married couples living together, 6.8% had a female householder with no husband present, and 21.7% were non-families. 17.0% of all households were made up of individuals, and 7.4% had someone living alone who was 65 years of age or older. The average household size was 2.90 and the average family size was 3.27.

In the CDP, the population was spread out, with 26.4% under the age of 18, 6.0% from 18 to 24, 30.2% from 25 to 44, 24.9% from 45 to 64, and 12.5% who were 65 years of age or older. The median age was 38 years. For every 100 females, there were 97.1 males. For every 100 females age 18 and over, there were 93.8 males.

The median income for a household in the CDP was $62,005, and the median income for a family was $71,000. Males had a median income of $50,991 versus $30,650 for females. The per capita income for the CDP was $24,086. About 2.2% of families and 3.5% of the population were below the poverty threshold, including 2.2% of those under age 18 and 5.8% of those age 65 or over.

Education
East Moriches has an elementary school, recently built, as well as a middle school. Once a student graduates 8th grade, they may choose to attend one of three high schools; Westhampton Beach, Center Moriches, or Eastport-South Manor.

Students from the East Moriches school district commonly refer to themselves as EMO, as an abbreviation for East Moriches.

TWA Flight 800

The U.S. Coast Guard Station, East Moriches, was used by emergency responders, and was the site where the bodies were initially prepared for transport. A helipad was constructed at the station, and the media located their equipment and crews there for breaking news. Today there are parks in Smith Point and Center Moriches on Long Island dedicated to those who died in the crash, and a plaque bearing their names. The cause of the explosion, which killed all 230 passengers and crew on board, was determined to be a short circuit which caused the contents of the centre-wing fuel tank to explode; however, many alternative theories exist.

References

Brookhaven, New York
Hamlets in New York (state)
Census-designated places in New York (state)
Census-designated places in Suffolk County, New York
Hamlets in Suffolk County, New York
Populated coastal places in New York (state)
TWA Flight 800